The quince (Cydonia oblonga) is the sole member of the genus Cydonia in the Malinae subtribe (which also contains apples and pears, among other fruits) of the Rosaceae family. It is a deciduous tree that bears hard, aromatic bright golden-yellow pome fruit, similar in appearance to a pear. Ripe quince fruits are hard, tart, and astringent. They are seldom eaten raw, but are processed into marmalade, jam, paste (known as quince cheese) or alcoholic beverages.

The quince tree is also grown as an ornamental plant for its attractive pale pink blossoms and other ornamental qualities.

Description

The immature fruit is green with dense grey-white fine hair, most of which rubs off before maturity in late autumn when the fruit changes colour to yellow with hard, strongly perfumed flesh.

The seeds contain nitriles, which are common in the seeds of the rose family.  In the stomach, enzymes or stomach acid or both cause some of the nitriles to be hydrolysed and produce hydrogen cyanide, which is a volatile gas. The seeds are only toxic if eaten in large quantities.

Taxonomy
Four other species previously included in the genus Cydonia are now treated in separate genera. These are Pseudocydonia sinensis and the three flowering quinces of eastern Asia in the genus Chaenomeles. Another unrelated fruit, the bael, is sometimes called the "Bengal quince".

The modern name originated in the 14th century as a plural of quoyn, via Old French cooin from Latin cotoneum malum / cydonium malum, ultimately from Greek κυδώνιον μῆλον, kydonion melon "Kydonian apple".

Cydonia is included in the subfamily Amygdaloideae.

Distribution and habitat 

Quince is native to the Hyrcanian forests south of the Caspian Sea, although it thrives in a variety of climates and can be grown successfully at latitudes as far north as Scotland. It should not be confused with its relatives, the Chinese quince, Pseudocydonia sinensis, or the flowering quinces of genus Chaenomeles, either of which is sometimes used as a culinary substitute.

History
The fruit was known in the Akkadian language  supurgillu; "quinces" (collective plural), which was borrowed into Aramaic as  sparglin; it was known in Judea during the Mishnaic Hebrew as  prishin (a loanword from Jewish Palestinian Aramaic  "the miraculous [fruit]"); quince flourished in the heat of the Mesopotamian plain, where apples did not. It was cultivated from an archaic period around the Mediterranean. Some ancients called the fruit "golden apples".

The Greeks associated it with Kydonia on Crete, as the "Cydonian pome", and Theophrastus, in his Enquiry into Plants, noted that quince was one of many fruiting plants that do not come true from seed.

As a sacred emblem of Aphrodite, a quince figured in a lost poem of Callimachus that survives in a prose epitome: seeing his beloved in the courtyard of the temple of Aphrodite, Acontius plucks a quince from the "orchard of Aphrodite", inscribes its skin and furtively rolls it at the feet of her illiterate nurse, whose curiosity aroused, hands it to the girl to read aloud, and the girl finds herself saying "I swear by Aphrodite that I will marry Acontius". A vow thus spoken in the goddess's temenos cannot be broken. Pliny the Elder mentions "numerous varieties" of quince in his Natural History and describes four. 

The season of ripe quinces is brief: the Roman cookbook De re coquinaria of Apicius specifies in attempting to keep quinces, to select perfect unbruised fruits and keep stems and leaves intact, submerged in honey and reduced wine.

Pests and diseases 

Quince is used as a food plant by the larvae of some Lepidoptera species including brown-tail, Bucculatrix bechsteinella, Bucculatrix pomifoliella, Coleophora cerasivorella, Coleophora malivorella, green pug and winter moth.

While quince is a hardy shrub, it may develop fungal diseases in hot weather, resulting in premature leaf fall. Quince leaf blight, caused by fungus Diplocarpon mespili, presents a threat in wet summers, causing severe leaf spotting and early defoliation, also affecting fruit to a lesser extent. It may also affect other Rosaceae plants such as hawthorn and medlar, but is typically less damaging than on quince. Cedar-quince rust, caused by Gymnosporangium clavipes, requires two hosts to complete the fungal life cycle, one being a cedar (most commonly a juniper, Juniperus virginiana) and the other a rosacea. Appearing as red excrescence on various parts of the plant, it may affect quinces grown in vicinity of junipers.

Cultivation 
Quince is a hardy, drought-tolerant shrub which adapts to many soils of low to medium pH. It tolerates both shade and sun, but sunlight is required to produce larger flowers and ensure fruit ripening. It is a hardy plant that does not require much maintenance, and tolerates years without pruning or major insect and disease problems. It is favored by landscape architects, such as Frederick Law Olmsted in the early 20th century, for its attractive blossoms.

Quince is cultivated on all continents in warm-temperate and temperate climates. It requires a cooler period of the year, with temperatures under , to flower properly. Propagation is done by cuttings or layering; the former method produces better plants, but they take longer to mature than by the latter. Named cultivars are propagated by cuttings or layers grafted on quince rootstock. Propagation by seed is not used commercially. Quince forms thick bushes, which must be pruned and reduced into a single stem to grow fruit-bearing trees for commercial use. The tree is self-pollinated, but it produces better yields when cross-pollinated.

Fruits are typically left on the tree to ripen fully. In warmer climates, it may become soft to the point of being edible, but additional ripening may be required in cooler climates. They are harvested in late autumn, before first frosts.

Quince is also used as rootstock for certain pear cultivars. The resultant chimera is called + Pirocydonia danielii.

In Europe, quinces are commonly grown in central and southern areas where the summers are sufficiently hot for the fruit to fully ripen. They are not grown in large amounts; typically one or two quince trees are grown in a mixed orchard with several apples and other fruit trees. In the 18th-century New England colonies, for example, there was always a quince at the lower corner of the vegetable garden, Ann Leighton notes in records of Portsmouth, New Hampshire and Newburyport, Massachusetts. Charlemagne directed that quinces be planted in well-stocked orchards. Quinces in England are first recorded in about 1275, when Edward I had some planted at the Tower of London.

Cultivars 

The cultivar 'Vranja' Nenadovic has gained the Royal Horticultural Society's Award of Garden Merit.

Production 
In 2020 world production of quinces amounted to 696,861 tonnes, with Turkey and China growing a combined 43% of the world total (table).

Uses 

Quinces are appreciated for their intense aroma, flavour, and tartness. However, most varieties of quince are too hard and tart to be eaten raw. However, they may be cooked or roasted and used for jams, marmalade, jellies, or pudding.

Culinary Use 
Some varieties of quince, such as 'Aromatnaya' and 'Kuganskaya' do not require cooking and can be eaten raw. However, most varieties of quince are too hard, astringent and sour to eat raw unless "bletted" (softened by frost and subsequent decay). High in pectin, they are used to make jam, jelly and quince pudding, or they may be peeled, then roasted, baked or stewed; pectin levels diminish as the fruit ripens. Long cooking with sugar  turns the flesh of the fruit red by formation of anthocyanins. The very strong perfume means they can be added in small quantities to apple pies and jam to enhance the flavor. Adding a diced quince to apple sauce will enhance the taste of the apple sauce with the chunks of relatively firm, tart quince.  The term "marmalade", originally meaning a quince jam, derives from marmelo, the Portuguese word for this fruit.

Quince cheese is firm, sticky, sweet reddish hard paste made from the quince fruit, and originating from the Iberian peninsula. It is known as marmelada across the Portuguese-speaking world and as carne de membrillo  or dulce de membrillo across the Spanish-speaking world, where it is used in a variety of recipes, eaten in sandwiches and with cheese, traditionally manchego cheese, or accompanying fresh curds.  In Chile, boiled quince is popular in desserts such as the murta con membrillo that combines Chilean guava with quince.

Nutrition
A raw quince is 84% water, 15% carbohydrates, and contains negligible fat and protein (table). In a  reference amount, the fruit provides  of food energy and a moderate amount of vitamin C (18% of the Daily Value), but no other micronutrients of significant quantity.

Alcoholic drink
In the Balkans and elsewhere, quince eau-de-vie (rakija) is made. For a quince rakija, ripe fruits of sweeter varieties are washed and cleared of rot and seeds, then crushed or minced, mixed with cold or boiling sweetened water and yeast, and left for several weeks to ferment. The fermented mash is distilled once, obtaining a 20–30 ABV, or twice, producing an approximately 60% ABV liquor. The two distillates may be mixed or diluted with distilled water to obtain the final product, containing 42–43% ABV. Traditionally, it is not aged in wooden casks.

In the Alsace region of France and the Valais region of Switzerland, liqueur de coing made from quince is used as a digestif.

In Carolina in 1709, John Lawson allowed that he was "not a fair judge of the different sorts of Quinces, which they call Brunswick, Portugal and Barbary", but he noted "of this fruit they make a wine or liquor which they call Quince-Drink, and which I approve of beyond any that their country affords, though a great deal of cider and perry is there made, The Quince-Drink most commonly purges."

Ornamental 
Quince is one of the most popular species for deciduous bonsai specimens, along with related Chinese quince and Japanese quince, native to Eastern Asia.

Medicinal value 
According to research, quince helps reduce symptoms of early pregnancy such as nausea and vomiting. Traditionally, the fruit has been used to cure digestive disorders; it had been alluded to in relation with H. Pylori, a bacteria causing ulcer in the stomach.

Cultural associations 
 In "El licenciado Vidriera" by Miguel de Cervantes, the protagonist develops the delusion that he is made of glass after he eats a poisoned quince.
 In Turkey, the expression ayvayı yemek (literally "to eat the quince") is used as a derogatory term indicating any unpleasant situation or a malevolent incident to avoid. This usage is likened to the rather bitter aftertaste of a quince fruit inside the mouth.
 When a baby is born in the Balkans, a quince tree is planted as a symbol of fertility, love and life.
 Ancient Greek poets (Ibycus and Aristophanes, for example) used quinces (kydonia) as a mildly ribald term for teenage breasts.
 In Plutarch's Lives, Solon is said to have decreed that "bride and bridegroom shall be shut into a chamber, and eat a quince together."
 In The Simpsons episode "Who Shot Mr. Burns? (Part One)", Homer sends Mr. Burns a box of chocolates with a family photo at the bottom. Burns and Smithers eschew the sour quince log, leaving Homer's face obscured in the photo.
The Goblin Market, a 19th century narrative poem by English poet, Christina Rossetti, references quinces in its opening lines, which list myriad fruits.

Gallery

See also 
 List of culinary fruits

References

External links 

 

Edible fruits
Flora of Turkey
Fruit trees
Maleae
Medicinal plants
Plants used in bonsai
Taxa named by Philip Miller